Nagrig is a village in the Gharbia Governorate, Egypt, near the city of Basyoun.

Notable people

 Mohamed Salah, forward for Liverpool F.C. and the Egyptian national team.

References 

Populated places in Gharbia Governorate